Barnett Salmon (1829 – 11 February 1897) was a British tobacco manufacturer, co-founder of Salmon & Gluckstein, which by 1901 was the world's largest retail tobacconist, owning 140 retail outlets.

Early life
He was the son of Aaron Solomons, a clothes dealer in London's East End, and his wife Jane Barnett Simmons.

Career
Salmon began his career as a travelling tobacco salesman. After his marriage in 1863, he went into business with his father-in-law, founding Salmon & Gluckstein

Personal life
He married Helena Gluckstein in 1863, the daughter of Samuel Gluckstein. They had nine sons and six daughters, but six died in infancy from scarlet fever.

Their children included:
 Sir Isidore Salmon (1876-1941), businessman and Conservative Party politician
 Alfred Salmon (1868-1928), father of Felix Addison Salmon, and great-grandfather of Nigella Lawson
 Montague Salmon (1878-?), father of Cyril Salmon, Baron Salmon, judge
 Harry Salmon JP (1881-1950), chairman from 1941-50 of J. Lyons and Co.
 Julius Salmon (1888-1940), married Emma Gluckstein, father of Brian Lawson Salmon

References

1829 births
1897 deaths
British Jews
Gluckstein family
Barnett